Sofi Jeannin (born 6 September 1976) is a Swedish choral conductor and mezzo-soprano.

Biography
Born in Stockholm to a Swedish mother and a French father, Jeannin grew up in Lindesberg, following her parents' divorce when she was age 8.  In her youth, Jeannin studied piano and singing.  She continued her musical education at the Conservatoire de Nice, where her instructors included Bertrand Dutour de Salvert.  Jeannin additionally studied at the Royal Academy of Music in Stockholm, where she also sang with the institution's vocal ensemble.

In the UK, Jeannin continued studies in choral conducting at the Royal College of Music (London), where her teachers included Paul Spicer. As a mezzo-soprano, she began to sing with London Voices in 2005.  In 2005, Jeannin joined the faculty of the Royal College of Music Junior Department, teaching singing and choral singing, and has also taught at Imperial College.  At the RCM, in November 2006, Jeannin conducted the UK premiere of Consolation I by Helmut Lachenmann.

From 2006 to 2008, Jeannin taught choral conducting at the Conservatoire d'Évry. Since March 2008, she has directed the Maîtrise de Radio France, with responsibility for amateur choir training, free choral instruction for young people, and work with the neighbourhood children of Bondy.  In July 2015, she became music director of the Choeur de Radio France, the first woman to hold the title.  Her tenure with the Choeur de Radio France was through the 2017-2018 season.  In January 2017, Jeannin first guest-conducted the BBC Singers in a concert at St Paul's Church, Knightsbridge.  In May 2017, the BBC announced her appointment as the next chief conductor of the BBC Singers, effective July 2018.  She is the first female conductor to be named to the post, and the first female conductor to be named chief conductor of a BBC classical music ensemble.  Jeannin made her debut at The Proms in August 2017. with the BBC Singers and the City of London Sinfonia.

Awards and honours
Jeannin received the medal of the Worshipful Company of Musicians of London in 2005.  Her other honours include:
 Chevalier des Arts et des Lettres (2009)
 Chevalier des Palmes Académiques (2018)
 Ordre national du Mérite (2021)

References

External links
 French-language page on Sofi Jeannin, Music Director of the Maitrise de Radio France
 Hear and Now, playlist for 25 November 2006 programme on BBC Radio 3
 Richard Whitehouse, Feature Review: Transcendent – The Music of Helmut Lachenmann.  Classical Source, November 2006
 BBC Singers programme page, 'Music for Epiphany', 7 January 2017, St Paul's Church, Knightsbridge

1976 births
Living people
Royal College of Music, Stockholm alumni
Chevaliers of the Ordre des Arts et des Lettres
Chevaliers of the Ordre des Palmes Académiques
Swedish choral conductors
Women conductors (music)
Musicians from Stockholm
21st-century conductors (music)